Minipteryx is a genus of crane fly, containing a single species, Minipteryx robusta, which was discovered in Australia in 2015.
The species was found in Kosciuszko National Park.

References 

Tipulidae
Monotypic Diptera genera